Myo or MYO may refer to:
Myo (Star Wars) is a character from Star Wars: Episode IV
Myo-, a prefix used in biology to denote muscle, originating from the Greek derived μῦς, mys
Maha Ne Myo (died 1825), Burmese general
Maronite Youth Organization, national youth group for teenagers that go to a Maronite church in the United States

See also
 Mayo (disambiguation), a word with a similar sound